"The Great Little Army" is a British military march that was composed by Kenneth J. Alford in 1916. Alford, whose real name is Frederick Joseph Ricketts, was a bandmaster from the British Army/Royal Marines who in his last position he was appointed to, directed the Band of HM Royal Marines, Plymouth. It was made to honour the British and Allied victories that were made in the Western Front (World War I). At the time, they were known as "The Contemptible Little Army" by the Imperial German Army.

The march is currently employed by various units in the British Army as a march past. The Canadian Army made the march the authorised march-past in quick time in 2013, replacing "" ("Quick, Clever and Ready"). Colleen McGrann, spokeswoman for the Canadian Army explained that "" was "neither particularly tuneful or easily recognizable" and that "The Great Little Army" "seemed appropriate in both name and tune".

The march is also the regimental quick march for the 2nd Battalion, Royal New Zealand Infantry Regiment as well as the Special Mobile Force of Mauritius.

References

1916 compositions
British military marches
Canadian military marches
New Zealand military marches
Songs of World War I
Songs with music by Kenneth J. Alford